The Bipartisan Policy Center (BPC) is a Washington, D.C.–based think tank that promotes bipartisanship. The organization aims to combine ideas from both the Republican and Democratic parties to address challenges in the U.S. BPC focuses on issues including health, energy, national security, the economy, housing, immigration, infrastructure, governance, and education. BPC was founded in 2007 by former Senate Majority Leaders Howard Baker, Tom Daschle, Bob Dole, and George J. Mitchell. As of 2021, the founding and current president is Jason Grumet.

History
While BPC was formally launched in March 2007, the organization's roots trace back to 2002, when the National Commission on Energy Policy (NCEP), predecessor to BPC's current Energy Project, was founded.

On June 17, 2009, BPC's Leaders Project on the State of American Health Care released a report, Crossing Our Lines: Working Together to Reform the U.S. Health System. The report, which came at the height of the health care reform debate in the United States, laid out plans to help states establish insurance exchanges and lower costs. Former Senate Majority Leaders and BPC Co-Founders Howard Baker, Tom Daschle, and Bob Dole crafted the report.

On November 17, 2010, BPC's "Debt Reduction Task Force" released its report, Restoring America's Future, in an effort to influence the debate over the national debt. The Task Force, led by former Senate Budget Committee Chairman Pete Domenici and former White House Budget Director and Federal Reserve Vice Chair Alice Rivlin, was a bipartisan group of former White House and Cabinet officials, Senate and House members, governors and mayors, and business and labor leaders. Their report was released two weeks prior to that of President Obama's National Commission on Fiscal Responsibility and Reform.

On May 23, 2011, House Minority Whip Steny Hoyer called for a balanced approach to deficit reduction in a speech at BPC. Hoyer said that both the White House's National Commission on Fiscal Responsibility and Reform and BPC's Debt Reduction Task Force "place a high priority on fairness, and strike a...more even balance between cutting spending and raising revenue."

On October 26, 2011, BPC launched the Housing Commission, a bipartisan effort led by Kit Bond, Henry Cisneros, Mel Martinez, and George J. Mitchell. The Commission released its final recommendations to reform the nation's housing policy in 2013, which included views on the most effective role of the federal government in helping to shape the nation's future housing landscape.

On March 21, 2012, BPC hosted "A Century of Service" at the Andrew W. Mellon Auditorium in Washington, D.C. The event was a tribute to BPC founders and former Senate Majority Leaders Howard Baker and Bob Dole. Speakers included Vice President Joe Biden, Senate Majority Leader Harry Reid, Republican Leader Mitch McConnell, and Senators Pat Roberts and Lamar Alexander. Former Senate Majority Leader Tom Daschle, a BPC founder, and former Leaders Trent Lott and Bill Frist, both BPC Senior Fellows, also made remarks. To highlight the accomplishments and contributions of the honorees, BPC unveiled two short films that offer a glimpse into the respective careers of Baker and Dole.

In 2013, BPC launched the Commission on Political Reform to investigate the causes and consequences of America's partisan political divide. Senators Tom Daschle, Trent Lott, and Olympia Snowe along with Secretary Dan Glickman and Governor Dirk Kempthorne announced a set of recommendations in June 2014. Over the course of 18 months, the commission, a group of thirty Americans from all political stripes, engaged concerned citizens across the country through town hall events and national surveys to develop the reforms.

In 2015, BPC announced the creation of the Congressional Patriot Awards, a biennial recognition given to two current or former members of the U.S. House of Representatives–one Democrat and one Republican–who have performed patriotic deeds worthy of remembrance. The first awards were given to Representative Sam Johnson, a Republican from Texas, and Representative John Lewis, a Democrat from Georgia, in a ceremony at the Library of Congress on March 15, 2016.

In March 2017, BPC celebrated its tenth anniversary at the Newseum in Washington, D.C. During the event, former Vice President Joe Biden was honored with the organization's Patriot Award.

In January 2018, BPC started the American Congressional Exchange program. In the program, members of congress agree to visit, for one weekend, a member of the opposite party in that member's district. That member, in turn, reciprocates the following year or when schedules permit.

Podcast
The Bipartisan Policy Center hosts a podcast titled "BPC Weekly" highlighting their organization's work.

Political action committee
BPC partners with a political action committee called BPC Action. BPC Action is "committed to seeing bipartisan policy solutions enacted into law", and "[works] closely with [its] 501(c)(3) partner, the Bipartisan Policy Center, to advance smart policies through the legislative process". BPC Action is a separate, 501(c)(4) nonprofit organization.

References

External links

 
Political advocacy groups in the United States
Political and economic think tanks in the United States
Centrist political advocacy groups in the United States
2007 establishments in Washington, D.C.